George Isaacs (1825 – 1876) was an Australian author. Born in England to a Jewish family, he moved to Adelaide, South Australia with his wife and child in 1851. Often writing under the pseudonym "A Pendragon", Isaacs' 1856 novel, The Queen of the South became the first novel to be published in South Australia, and his play Burlesque of Frankenstein is recognised as the first Australian work of science fiction.

While in South Australia he founded The Critic, and contributed to other publications such as The Bunyip and The Observer.

References

19th-century Australian poets
1825 births
1876 deaths